Heinz Warnken (28 December 1912 – 1943) was a German footballer who played as a midfielder for Komet Bremen and the Germany national team.

References

1912 births
1943 deaths
Association football midfielders
German footballers
Footballers from Bremen
Germany international footballers
German military personnel killed in World War II
Military personnel from Bremen